Kəndi Söyüdlü  (known as Nəftəluq, Naftuluq, Naftaluk or Navtlug until 2001) is a village in the Jalilabad Rayon of Azerbaijan.

References 

Populated places in Jalilabad District (Azerbaijan)